In enzymology, a D-benzoylarginine-4-nitroanilide amidase is an enzyme that catalyzes the chemical reaction

N-benzoyl-D-arginine-4-nitroanilide + H2O  N-benzoyl-D-arginine + 4-nitroaniline

Thus, the two substrates of this enzyme are N-benzoyl-D-arginine-4-nitroanilide and H2O, whereas its two products are N-benzoyl-D-arginine and 4-nitroaniline.

This enzyme belongs to the family of hydrolases, those acting on carbon-nitrogen bonds other than peptide bonds, specifically in linear amides.  The systematic name of this enzyme class is N-benzoyl-D-arginine-4-nitroanilide amidohydrolase. Other names in common use include benzoyl-D-arginine arylamidase, and D-BAPA-ase.

References

 

EC 3.5.1
Enzymes of unknown structure